VIW may refer to:

 Victim/Informant/Witness, in law enforcement jargon
 Violence in the workplace
 Voices in the Wilderness (organization), a 1995 a campaign to end the US/UN sanctions regime against Iraq
 VIW, a historic radio broadcaster in Australia

See also
View (disambiguation)